Tillandsia baliophylla is a species in the genus Tillandsia. It is endemic to the Island of Hispaniola in the West Indies.

Cultivars
 × Vrieslandsia 'Fire Magic'

References

baliophylla
Flora of Haiti
Flora of the Dominican Republic
Plants described in 1935